Grains are the seeds of arable crops or the crops bearing them. 

Grain or grains may also refer to:

Material structures
Grain (textile), the orientation of a woven textile used in a garment
Grain, a solid-fuel rocket's propellant charge; roughly a hollow cylinder, sometimes textured, and possibly very large
Crystallite or "grain" in metallurgy, a single crystal inside solid-state matter
Film grain, the gritty texture sometimes apparent on images produced using photographic film or paper (grainy)
Grain size (or particle size), for particles of rock in geology
Wood grain, the alignment and texture of the fibres in wood

Places
Isle of Grain in Kent, England
Grain Power Station, a power station on the Isle of Grain
Grain Valley, Missouri, a city in the USA

Arts, entertainment, and media
Grain (film), 2015 European film by Semih Kaplanoğlu
Grain (magazine), a Canadian literary magazine
"The Grain", an 1886 short story by Leo Tolstoy

Other uses
Grain (unit), a unit of mass equal to 64.79891 milligrams,  of an avoirdupois pound
Grains per gallon, a unit of water hardness
Grain (cipher), a stream cipher designed for restricted hardware environments
Grain 128a, successor of Grain cipher
Grain (surfboard company), a company that manufactures hollow wooden surfboards
Grain (company), a Series B Singaporean food-delivery startup
GRAIN, an international non-governmental organization for sustainable agriculture
Grain of salt, an idiom

See also
Granule (disambiguation)
Peter Grain (disambiguation)